Tavai is a surname. Notable people with the surname include:

Etuate Tavai (died 1999), Fijian politician, 31st Attorney General of Fiji
J. R. Tavai (born 1993), Samoan-American football defensive lineman
Jahlani Tavai (born 1996), Samoan-American football linebacker